Joseph Donald Reid Cabral (June 9, 1923 – July 22, 2006) was a Dominican politician and lawyer. Reid became president during the "triumvirate" from December 28, 1963 to April 25, 1965.

Biography 
Donald Reid Cabral was born in Santiago de los Caballeros, Dominican Republic. He was the son of William Reid, a Scottish immigrant from Perthshire who worked as a banker in Santo Domingo. His mother, Auristela Cabral Bermúdez, had come from a politically affluent family, and was a descendant of three ex-presidents of the Dominican Republic (Buenaventura Báez, José María Cabral and Marcos Antonio Cabral). Reid Cabral enrolled in the Universidad Autónoma de Santo Domingo where he studied Law.

Reid was married to Clara Tejera Álvarez, who served as first lady during his presidency.

Politics
Donald Reid Cabral first served as an ambassador to the United Nations and Israel. He was part of the Council of State that formed in 1962 and 1963, after the overthrow of the regime of Rafael Leónidas Trujillo.

Reid also chaired the triumvirate which ruled the Dominican Republic following the overthrow of the constitutional government of Juan Bosch (1963–1965), and in that capacity he was the Secretary of Foreign Affairs and the Ministry of the Armed Forces. In 1965 a pro-Juan Bosch uprising occurred, which would ultimately lead to his overthrow, although the US tried to end it in the Operation Power Pack.

From 1986 to 1988 he acted as the nation's foreign minister. In the last stage of his life was closely linked to the Social Christian Reformist Party (PRSC), founded by Joaquín Balaguer.

Business 
In 1947, Donald Reid Cabral founded, along with Rogelio Pellerano, Reid & Pellerano Co., later Grupo ReidCo, a major automotive distributor in Dominican Republic.

Ancestors

References 

1923 births
2006 deaths
Presidents of the Dominican Republic
Descendants of Buenaventura Báez
Permanent Representatives of the Dominican Republic to the United Nations
Ambassadors of the Dominican Republic to Israel
Presidents of political parties in the Dominican Republic
Social Christian Reformist Party politicians
People from Santiago de los Caballeros
Dominican Republic people of French descent
Dominican Republic people of Galician descent
Dominican Republic people of Portuguese descent
Dominican Republic people of Scottish descent
Dominican Republic people of Spanish descent
Dominican Republic people of Walloon descent
White Dominicans